Propaganda is a 2012 New Zealand documentary, propaganda or mockumentary film directed by Slavko Martinov. It takes the view of the North Korean government and describes western media and culture as purely forms of propaganda. Before its first official appearance at a film festival (IDFA) in November 2012, it appeared on YouTube as part of a social experiment, where it was presented as true North Korean propaganda movie. This was revealed as a hoax when the movie was submitted to film festivals by the director.

References 

Propaganda films
2010s mockumentary films